Mission Bay may refer to:

Places

Australia
the former name of Minjilang, Northern Territory

New Zealand
Mission Bay, New Zealand, a suburb of Auckland

United States
Mission Bay (San Diego), a bay within Mission Bay Park
Mission Bay (San Francisco), a bay on the west shore of San Francisco Bay, now mostly filled in to create the Mission Bay neighborhood
Mission Bay, San Francisco, a neighborhood 
Mission Bay, Florida, a census-designated place located in Palm Beach County
Mission Bay (Texas), a bay that feeds into Copano Bay

Military
, a World War II aircraft carrier of the United States Navy
Mission bay, a compartment which can be reconfigured to hold different mission-specific packages, as in the United States Navy's Littoral combat ship

Other
Mission Bay, a release candidate for version 1.0 of the Mozilla Firefox web browser